Cyrille Pons (born 28 November 1963) is a French former rugby league player.

Biography 
He mostly spent his sports career with Saint-Gaudens with which he won the  Championnat de France in 1991 and the Lord Derby Cup (1991 and 1992).

Due to his club performances, he became a regular player for the France national team between 1987 and 1992, playing the 1989-1992 Rugby League World Cup.

After his career, he became a manager of the France national rugby league team.

Honours 
 Team honours :
 French Champion : 1991 (Saint-Gaudens).
 Winner of the Lord Derby Cup : 1991 and 1992 (Saint-Gaudens).

References

External links 
Cyril Pons at rugbyleagueproject.com

1963 births
Living people
France national rugby league team players
Saint-Gaudens Bears players
Rugby league wingers
Sportspeople from Toulouse